Frida High School is a private secondary school located in Vänersborg, Sweden. It was started in 2006 and is part of the greater concern Frida Utbildning AB, which also operates three elementary schools in Trestad. Frida High has approximately 190 students, which makes it a fairly small school by both European and Swedish means. The school is located in facilities historically accommodated by the army, but along with many others nationally, the regiment was closed during the early 20th century.

The school offers two programs of education: the Social Scientific, and the Natural Scientific. Both programs are theoretical and offer the students a vast selection of possible colleges and universities for future studies. Frida High is famous for its policy of student self-responsibility. This is demonstrated by much scheduled individual study time, which allows the students to finish assignments they may have, or to book meetings with teachers to discuss their progress, etc. The students are also supplied with a MacBook, which is a tool of study as opposed to books and leaflets. The majority of all school works are handed in digitally, and written-form hand-ins are rare.

References

2006 establishments in Sweden
Educational institutions established in 2006
Schools in Sweden
Buildings and structures in Västra Götaland County
Vänersborg Municipality